Clásico cordobés is the football match in Argentina between Córdoba rivals Belgrano and Talleres. It is one of the oldest football derbies in Argentina, with its first match held in 1914 and won by Belgrano 1–0.

With 250 official matches played, Talleres has the most wins with 95. The last official meeting between both clubs was during the 2018–19 season. Held on 7 February 2022 at Estadio Mario Alberto Kempes, Talleres won 3–0.

Highlights 
 The first match between both clubs was played on 17 May 1914, being won by Belgrano 1–0.
 The largest Belgrano's win in the history was a 8–1 in Liga Cordobesa, on 29 November 1914.
 The largest win in an AFA competition was on 16 November 1996, when Talleres beat Belgrano 5–0 in the 1996–97 Primera B Nacional season. All the goals were scored by José Zelaya.
 On 15 July 1998 Talleres won the 1997–98 Primera B Nacional championship after beating Belgrano in the promotion playoff decided via penalty shoot-out after a 2–2 aggregate score. This result allowed Talleres not only to be crowned champion but to return to the top division of Argentine football. It is also regarded as the most important final in the history of football in Córdoba Province.
 In domestic cups level, Talleres and Belgrano played only once, on 13 March 2013 in the 2012–13 Copa Argentina. Talleres (who competed in the third division by then) eliminated Belgrano after beating them 1–0 in knockout stage.

Statistics 
Only official matches included:

Records 
In official matches:

Appearances

Goalscorers (all competitions)

Goalscorers (AFA competitions)

Comparative charts 
Updated to season 2017–18.

References

Argentine football rivalries
Club Atlético Belgrano
Talleres de Córdoba
Football in Córdoba Province, Argentina